Christopher F. Foss (born 1946) is a British artist and science fiction illustrator. He is best known for his science fiction book covers and the black and white illustrations for the original editions of The Joy of Sex.

Career

Early work
Born in 1946 in Guernsey, Channel Islands, Foss started working there as an artist in his teens, creating signage for local companies. He went to a boarding school in Dorset; his master encouraged him to train for an art scholarship. While studying at Magdalene College, Cambridge, he started pursuing professional magazine commissions, including the then recently launched Penthouse magazine.

Science-fiction illustrations
Books featuring Foss illustrations include the 1970s British paperback covers for Isaac Asimov's Foundation Trilogy, several of Edmund Cooper novels, and E. E. "Doc" Smith's Lensman and Skylark series. Some of the art he did produce was specific to the stories and some examples of this are the covers he did for the Grafton publications of the Demon Princes novels by Jack Vance in the late 1980s, Star King, The Killing Machine, The Palace of Love, The Face and The Book of Dreams.

Not being a fan of science fiction, Foss typically did not read the books he illustrated, preferring to paint scenes entirely from his imagination.

In 1975, Foss was hired by director Alejandro Jodorowsky for an intended film version of the science-fiction novel Dune by author Frank Herbert. He delivered several conceptual studies published in the book 21st Century Foss, containing a foreword by Jodorowsky. The project failed. In 1977 Foss worked for several months on studies for the movie Alien (not being used in the movie) and also did some designs of the planet Krypton for the movie Superman. Some of his crystal structures for the planet were realised in the movie, although they were used as ice-structures.

During this period Chris Foss illustrated the sleeve of the album Clear Air Turbulence for the Ian Gillan Band.

Painter Glenn Brown controversially appropriated individual space scene paintings by Foss and in the one case copying and altering it (Exercise One (for Ian Curtis), 1995) and in the other, leaving it entirely unchanged (Dark Angel (for Ian Curtis), 2002). The titles of these works reference the vocalist of the band Joy Division, who died by his own hand.

Chris Foss created much of the color concept art for Sweetpea Entertainment's Traveller franchise, as produced by Imperium Games. He produced 12 pages of artwork for the new Traveller edition's first supplement, Starships (1996). He also illustrated a number of covers for Imperium's Traveller.

Diary of a Spaceperson
In 1990, Foss released a book, Diary of a Spaceperson (published by Paper Tiger), that was vague about many of the details of its production. It is a tome of his work to date. However, there is no way of knowing what that date is, which in some way provides some potency to the story within, as it is stated in the foreword that "the contents of the book are extracts of a 'spaceperson's diary' and are duplicated within", and "that the dates published within are of no meaning".

Although there is a vast number of his paintings within the book, hardly a large percentage of what he has produced is featured, and the fictional diary text itself also bears little connection to the paintings, except in some contrived ways. There is also no mention of the actual or original titles for any of the featured artworks, but many have been seen on the covers of authors' science fiction.

It also features many sketches in various states of completion, some of which are seen completed and painted in other parts of the book. In fact only some of the images, all of which feature architecture and craft, are rendered in paint; the rest of the works are nudes and sketches of women.

The Joy of Sex
In contrast, Foss's numerous illustrations for the sex manual The Joy of Sex are done in a much softer, natural style. The illustrations were based on photographs taken by Chris in his studio in Fulham, London.

Film work 
 1977 Jodorowsky version of Dune, spaceship and vehicle design.
 1978 Superman by Richard Donner. Planet Krypton and set design (not used)
 1979 Alien by Ridley Scott. Spaceship design (not used)
 1980 Flash Gordon by Mike Hodges. Redesign of Gordon's rocket cycle
 1995  (German Sc-fi comedy) Spaceship design
 2000 A.I. Artificial Intelligence under Stanley Kubrick, until Kubrick's death in 1999
 2014 Guardians of the Galaxy under James Gunn, who brought him on board to design the film's various spacecraft.

Bibliography
 Foss, Chris. 21st Century Foss. Dragon's Dream, 1978. .
 Foss, Chris. Hardware: The Definitive SF Works of Chris Foss. Titan Publishing, 2011.

References

External links
 Chris Foss's Official site
 
 A gallery of Foss's French books covers
 About Chris Foss in French
 New Scientist interview with Chris Foss
 

1946 births
British illustrators
British speculative fiction artists
Guernsey people
Living people
Science fiction artists